Rosnoën is a commune in the Finistère department of Brittany in north-western France.

Population
Inhabitants of Rosnoën are called in French Rosnoënais.

Geography

The village occupies a peninsula between the mouths or the Aulne river and Faou river. Térénez bridge is located between Rosnoën and Landévennec. The bridge crosses the mouth of the Aulne river, connecting Crozon Peninsula to Brittany.

Map

See also
Communes of the Finistère department
Parc naturel régional d'Armorique

References

External links

Official website 

Mayors of Finistère Association 

Communes of Finistère